Le Terrible is a  strategic nuclear submarine of the French Navy. The boat was launched on 21 March 2008 

On 27 January 2010, at 9h25, Le Terrible launched an M51 SLBM from underwater, in Audierne Bay.

The submarine was put into service on 20 September 2010 armed with the 16 M51 missiles.
Terrible is fitted with a new SYCOBS combat system (SYstem de COmbat Barracuda-SSBN) which will also be installed on the new Barracuda class SSNs.

In July 2017 French president Macron visited the submarine in the Atlantic and took part in a simulated missile launch.

See also 

List of submarines of France

Sources and references 

Triomphant-class submarines
Ships built in France
2008 ships
Submarines of France